Kreutz is a German surname, and may refer to:

People
Arthur Kreutz (1906–1991), American composer
Carolus Adrianus Johannes Kreutz (born 1954), Dutch botanist/orchidologist
Karl Kreutz (1909–1997), a Standartenführer (Colonel) in the Waffen-SS
Heinrich Kreutz (1854–1907), German astronomer
Ludivine Kreutz (born 1973), French golfer
Olin Kreutz (born 1977), American football center
Phoebe Kreutz, American singer-songwriter
Robert E. Kreutz (1922–1996), American composer

Places
Kreutz Creek, a tributary of the Susquehanna River in York County, Pennsylvania
Kreutz, the German name for the city of Križevci, Croatia
Groß Kreutz, a municipality in Brandenburg, Germany

Other uses
3635 Kreutz, a Mars-crossing asteroid
Kreutz Sungrazers, a family of sungrazing comets named after Heinrich Kreutz

See also
Creutz (disambiguation)
Kreuz (disambiguation)
Kreuzer (disambiguation)
Kreutzer (disambiguation)